Moshe Shachak (born Moshe Charshak, 1936) is an ecologist at the Ben Gurion University. Shachak’s research focuses on ecosystem engineers, organisms that modulate the abiotic environment. Most of his studies were conducted in arid and semi arid ecosystems.

Major contributions
Shachak was born in Tel Aviv, Israel. In his early career, he studied desert animals and eco-hydrological processes in small desert watershed. Together with colleges he showed that herbivory of snails on cyanobacteria  living inside rocks  has major impacts of weathering  of that rocky desert. This effect was found to be similar in magnitude to aeolian deposition in that area. A follow-up study showed that this herbivory has a fertilization effect which is about 11% of the nitrogen input in that system. These findings, led to the development of the concept of ecosystem engineers together with Clive Jones and John Lawton. Ecosystem engineers are organisms that change the environment thereby affecting the distribution of many other organisms. Although controversial at the beginning, this concept had become widely accepted. One of the original papers was named in the list of the 100 most influential papers in ecology and today the concept appears in mainstream ecological textbooks. Shachak’s more recent research focuses on plants and cyanobacteria engineers and pattern formation.

References

1936 births
Academic staff of Ben-Gurion University of the Negev
Ecologists
Israeli biologists
Living people
People from Tel Aviv